Maria "Malu" Lourdes Maglutac Chiongbian (born October 10, 1960) is a former Filipino TV show host, ballet dancer, model, actress, newscaster, and beauty pageant title holder. She co-hosted the hit variety show Student Canteen from 1984-1990.

Early life 
Malu Maglutac was born in 1960 in Makati, Philippines. She is the daughter of businessman Mariano Maglutac and Alice Morales. She and her two older brothers, Joey and Thomas, were brought up in Bel-Air Village, a gated subdivision in the Makati area. Maglutac was raised Catholic, but she later identified as Christian.

She began studying Ballet at age 4 under the late Inday Gaston Mañosa.

Throughout elementary and high school at St. Paul College Manila, Malu was on the honor roll and consistently excelled in her classes. Despite a rigorous ballet training schedule, she captained the Cheerleading Team. She continued her higher education at University of the Philippines, Diliman  and received B.S. Tourism degree.

TV career 
 Weather Girl
 News Anchor
 Student Canteen
 Kumpletos Recados

Personal life 
She married businessman Roy Chiongbian on October 8, 2001. They have a daughter together. She has three dogs.

References 

1960 births
Filipino television journalists
Filipino television actresses
Filipino ballerinas
People from Makati
University of the Philippines Diliman alumni
Living people
St. Paul University alumni
Women television journalists